The women's 100 metre backstroke event at the 2018 Commonwealth Games was held on 6 and 7 April at the Gold Coast Aquatic Centre.

Schedule
The schedule is as follows:

All times are Australian Eastern Standard Time (UTC+10)

Records
Prior to this competition, the existing world, Commonwealth and Games records were as follows:

The following records were established during the competition:

Results

Heats

Semifinals

Swim-off

Final

References

Women's 100 metre backstroke
Commonwealth Games
Common